The mayor of Venice (Italian: sindaco di Venezia) is an elected politician who, along with the Venice City Council of 36 members, is accountable for the strategic government of the municipality of Venice, Veneto, Italy.

The current office holder is Luigi Brugnaro, a centre-right wing independent businessman who has been in charge since 2015. The last election took place in 2020.

Overview

According to the Italian Constitution, the Mayor of Venice is member of the Venice's City Council. Although the title Mayor is not held by the heads of the six boroughs of Venice, because they do not actually preside over self-governmental municipalities.

The Mayor is elected by the population of Venice. Citizens elect also the members of the City Council, which also controls Mayor's policy guidelines and is able to enforce his resignation by a motion of no confidence. The Mayor is entitled to appoint and release the members of his government.

Since 1993 the Mayor is elected directly by Venice's electorate: in all mayoral elections in Italy in cities with a population higher than 15,000 the voters express a direct choice for the mayor or an indirect choice voting for the party of the candidate's coalition. If no candidate receives at least 50% of votes, the top two candidates go to a second round after two weeks. The election of the City Council is based on a direct choice for the candidate with a preference vote: the candidate with the majority of the preferences is elected. The number of the seats for each party is determined proportionally.

The seat of the City Council is the city hall Ca' Loredan on the Canal Grande.

List of mayors of Venice

Podestà (1806–1866)
Podestà of Venice were appointed since 1806 to 1866 by the rulers of the city during the early- to mid-19th century: Napoleon and the Habsburgs.
1806–1811 – Daniele Renier
1811–1816 – Bartolomeo Gerolamo Gradenigo
1817–1818 – Marco Molin
1818–1827 – Francesco Calbo Crotta
1827–1834 – Domenico Morosini
1834–1837 – Giuseppe Boldù
1838–1857 – Giovanni Correr
1857–1859 – Alessandro Marcello
1860–1866 – Pierluigi Bembo

Kingdom of Italy (1866–1946)
In 1860, the nascent Kingdom of Italy created the office of the Mayor of Venice (Sindaco di Venezia), chosen by the City council:

Republic of Italy (since 1946)

City Council election (1946–1993)
From 1946 to 1993, the Mayor of Venice was chosen by the City Council.

Notes

Direct election (since 1993)
Since 1993, under provisions of new local administration law, the Mayor of Venice is chosen by direct election, originally every four, and later every five years:

Notes

Timeline

Faszomat

City Council elections, 1946–1990

Number of votes for each party:

Number of seats in the City Council for each party:

Mayoral and City Council election, 1993
The election took place in two rounds: the first on 21 November, the second on 5 December 1993.

|- style="background-color:#E9E9E9;text-align:center;"
|- 
| colspan="7"| 
|-
! colspan="4" rowspan="1" style="text-align:left;" | Parties and coalitions
! colspan="1" | Votes
! colspan="1" | %
! colspan="1" | Seats
|-
| style="background-color:pink" rowspan="6" |
| style="background-color:" |
| style="text-align:left;" | Democratic Party of the Left (Partito Democratico della Sinistra)
| PDS
| 33,997 || 20.59% || 16
|-
| style="background-color:" |
| style="text-align:left;" | Communist Refoundation Party (Rifondazione Comunista)
| PRC
| 10,738 || 6.50% || 5
|-
| style="background-color:" |
| style="text-align:left;" | Federation of the Greens (Federazione dei Verdi)
| FdV
| 9,901 || 6.00% || 4
|-
| style="background-color:" |
| style="text-align:left;" | Socialist Progress (Progresso Socialista)
| PS
| 5,824 || 3.53% || 2
|-
| style="background-color:orange" |
| style="text-align:left;" | Alliance Venice-Mestre (Alleanza Venezia-Mestre)
| AVM
| 2,244 || 1.36% || 1
|-
| style="background-color:" |
| style="text-align:left;" | The Network (La Rete)
| LR 
| 1,996 || 1.21% || 0
|- style="background-color:pink"
| style="text-align:left;" colspan="4" | Cacciari coalition (Left-wing)
| 64,700 || 39.18% || 28
|-
| style="background-color:" |
| style="text-align:left;" colspan="2" | Liga Veneta−Lega Nord 
| LV–LN
| 49,350 || 29.88% || 10
|-
| style="background-color:lightblue" rowspan="4" |
| style="background-color:" |
| style="text-align:left;" | Christian Democracy (Democrazia Cristiana)
| DC
| 20,384 || 12.34% || 5
|-
| style="background-color:pink" |
| style="text-align:left;" | Lega Autonomia Veneta 
| LAV
| 8,387 || 5.08% || 1
|-
| style="background-color:gold" |
| style="text-align:left;" | Venice-Mestre Pact (Patto Venezia-Mestre)
| PVM
| 4,891 || 2.96% || 1
|-
| style="background-color:" |
| style="text-align:left;" | Others 
| 
| 2,949 || 1.79% || 0
|- style="background-color:lightblue"
| colspan="4" style="text-align:left;" | Castellani coalition (Centre)
| 36,611 || 22.17% || 7
|-
| style="background-color:" |
| style="text-align:left;" colspan="2" | Italian Social Movement (Movimento Sociale Italiano)
| MSI-DN
| 5,580 || 3.38% || 1
|-
| style="background-color:" |
| style="text-align:left;" colspan="2" | Others 
| 
| 8,909 || 5.39% || 0
|-
| colspan="7" style="background-color:#E9E9E9" | 
|- style="font-weight:bold;"
| style="text-align:left;" colspan="4" | Total
| 165,150 || 100% || 46
|-
| colspan="7" style="background-color:#E9E9E9" | 
|-
| style="text-align:left;" colspan="4" | Votes cast / turnout 
| 224,180 || 82.94% || style="background-color:#E9E9E9;" |
|-
| style="text-align:left;" colspan="4" | Registered voters
| 270,305 ||  || style="background-color:#E9E9E9;" |
|-
| colspan="7" style="background-color:#E9E9E9" | 
|-
| style="text-align:left;" colspan="7" | Source: Ministry of the Interior
|}

Mayoral and City Council election, 1997
The election took place on 16 November 1997.

|- style="background-color:#E9E9E9;text-align:center;"
|- 
| colspan="7"| 
|-
! colspan="4" rowspan="1" style="text-align:left;" | Parties and coalitions
! colspan="1" | Votes
! colspan="1" | %
! colspan="1" | Seats
|-
| style="background-color:pink" rowspan="6" |
| style="background-color:" |
| style="text-align:left;" | Democratic Party of the Left (Partito Democratico della Sinistra)
| PDS
| 30,052 || 23.22% || 12
|-
| style="background-color:pink" |
| style="text-align:left;" | Italian People's Party (Partito Popolare Italiano)
| PPI
| 12,287 || 9.49% || 5
|-
| style="background-color:" |
| style="text-align:left;" | Communist Refoundation Party (Rifondazione Comunista)
| PRC
| 11,135 || 8.60% || 4
|-
| style="background-color:"  |
| style="text-align:left;" | Federation of the Greens (Federazione dei Verdi)
| FdV
| 10,506 || 8.12% || 4
|-
| style="background-color:" |
| style="text-align:left;" | Others 
| 
| 13,193 || 10.20% || 5
|- style="background-color:pink"
| colspan="3" style="text-align:left;" | Cacciari coalition (Centre-left)
| 77,173 || 59.63% || 30
|-
| style="background-color:lightblue" rowspan="3" |
| style="background-color:" |
| style="text-align:left;" | Forza Italia 
| FI
| 14,608 || 11.29% ||6
|-
| style="background-color:" |
| style="text-align:left;" | National Alliance (Alleanza Nazionale)
| AN
| 11,039 || 8.53% || 4
|-
| style="background-color:" |
| style="text-align:left;" | Christian Democratic Centre (Centro Cristiano Democratico)
| CCD
| 4,501 || 3.48% || 1
|- style="background-color:lightblue"
| style="text-align:left;" colspan="4" | Pizzigati coalition (Centre-right)
| 30,148 || 23.29% || 11
|-
| style="background-color:#92FF92" rowspan="2" |
| style="background-color:" |
| style="text-align:left;" | Liga Veneta–Lega Nord
| LV–LN
| 14,224 || 10.99% || 5
|-
| style="background-color:" |
| style="text-align:left;" | Others 
| 
| 878 || 0.68% || 0
|- style="background-color:#92FF92"
| colspan="4" style="text-align:left;" | Fabris coalition
| 15,102 || 11.67% || 5
|-
| style="background-color:" |
| style="text-align:left;" colspan="2" | Others 
| 
| 7,003 || 5.41% || 0
|-
| colspan="7" style="background-color:#E9E9E9" | 
|- style="font-weight:bold;"
| style="text-align:left;" colspan="4" | Total
| 129,426 || 100% || 46
|-
| colspan="7" style="background-color:#E9E9E9" | 
|-
| style="text-align:left;" colspan="4" | Votes cast / turnout 
| 189,592 || 72.02% || style="background-color:#E9E9E9;" |
|-
| style="text-align:left;" colspan="4" | Registered voters
| 263,237 ||  || style="background-color:#E9E9E9;" |
|-
| colspan="7" style="background-color:#E9E9E9" | 
|-
| style="text-align:left;" colspan="7" | Source: Ministry of the Interior
|}

Mayoral and City Council election, 2000
The election took place in two rounds: the first on 16 April, the second on 30 April 2000.

|- style="background-color:#E9E9E9;text-align:center;"
|- 
| colspan="7"| 
|-
! colspan="4" rowspan="1" style="text-align:left;" | Parties and coalitions
! colspan="1" | Votes
! colspan="1" | %
! colspan="1" | Seats
|-
| style="background-color:lightblue" rowspan="6" |
| style="background-color:" |
| style="text-align:left;" | Forza Italia 
| FI
| 34,261 || 25.30% ||13
|-
| style="background-color:" |
| style="text-align:left;" | National Alliance (Alleanza Nazionale)
| AN
| 9,489 || 7.01% || 3
|-
| style="background-color:" |
| style="text-align:left;" | Lega Nord 
| LN
| 5,212 || 3.85% || 1
|-
| style="background-color:" |
| style="text-align:left;" | United Christian Democrats (Cristiani Democratici Uniti)
| CDU
| 2,807 || 2.07% || 1
|-
| style="background-color:" |
| style="text-align:left;" | Christian Democratic Centre (Centro Cristiano Democratico)
| CCD
| 2,428 || 1.79% || 0
|-
| style="background-color:#1560BD" |
| style="text-align:left;" | Sgarbi Liberal List (Liberal Sgarbi)
| LS
| 1,139 || 0.84% || 0
|- style="background-color:lightblue"
| style="text-align:left;" colspan="4" | Brunetta coalition (Centre-right)
| 55,336 || 40.86% || 18
|-
| style="background-color:pink" rowspan="5" |
| style="background-color:" |
| style="text-align:left;" | Democrats of the Left (Democratici di Sinistra)
| DS
| 28,984 || 21.40% || 13
|-
| style="background-color:pink" |
| style="text-align:left;" | Italian People's Party (Partito Popolare Italiano)
| PPI
| 10,630 || 7.85% || 4
|-
| style="background-color:purple"  |
| style="text-align:left;" | Italian Democratic Socialists (Socialisti Democratici Italiani)
| SDI
| 7,058 || 5.21% || 3
|-
|-
| style="background-color:"  |
| style="text-align:left;" | Party of Italian Communists (Partito dei Comunisti Italiani)
| PdCI
| 2,604 || 1.92% || 1
|-
| style="background-color:" |
| style="text-align:left;" | Others 
| 
| 976 || 0.72% || 0
|- style="background-color:pink"
| colspan="4" style="text-align:left;" | Costa coalition (Center-left)
| 50,252 || 37.09% ||21
|-
| style="background-color:#FA6E79" rowspan="3" |
| style="background-color:" |
| style="text-align:left;" | Communist Refoundation Party (Rifondazione Comunista)
| PRC
| 10,440 || 7.71% || 5
|-
| style="background-color:" |
| style="text-align:left;" | Federation of the Greens (Federazione dei Verdi)
| FdV
| 4,724 || 3.49% || 1
|-
| style="background-color:" |
| style="text-align:left;" | Others 
| 
| 4,192 || 3.10% || 1
|- style="background-color:#FA6E79"
| colspan="4" style="text-align:left;" | Bettin coalition (Left-wing)
| 19,356 || 14.30% ||7
|-
| style="background-color:" |
| style="text-align:left;" colspan="2" | Others 
| 
| 10,499 || 7.75% || 0
|-
| colspan="7" style="background-color:#E9E9E9" | 
|- style="font-weight:bold;"
| style="text-align:left;" colspan="4" | Total
| 135,433 || 100% || 46
|-
| colspan="7" style="background-color:#E9E9E9" | 
|-
| style="text-align:left;" colspan="4" | Votes cast / turnout 
| 177,510 || 71.88% || style="background-color:#E9E9E9;" |
|-
| style="text-align:left;" colspan="4" | Registered voters
| 246,962 ||  || style="background-color:#E9E9E9;" |
|-
| colspan="7" style="background-color:#E9E9E9" | 
|-
| style="text-align:left;" colspan="7" | Source: Ministry of the Interior
|}
Notes

Mayoral and City Council election, 2005
The election took place on two rounds: the first on 3–4 April, the second on 17–18 April 2005.

|- style="background-color:#E9E9E9;text-align:center;"
|- 
| colspan="7"| 
|-
! colspan="4" rowspan="1" style="text-align:left;" | Parties and coalitions
! colspan="1" | Votes
! colspan="1" | %
! colspan="1" | Seats
|-
| style="background-color:#FA6E79" rowspan="7" |
| style="background-color:" |
| style="text-align:left;" | Democrats of the Left (Democratici di Sinistra)
| DS
| 26,531 || 21.15% || 6
|-
| style="background-color:" |
| style="text-align:left;" | Communist Refoundation Party (Rifondazione Comunista)
| PRC
| 8,509 || 6.78% || 1
|-
| style="background-color:" |
| style="text-align:left;" | Federation of the Greens (Federazione dei Verdi)
| FdV
| 4,882 || 3.89% || 1
|-
| style="background-color:"  |
| style="text-align:left;" | Party of Italian Communists (Partito dei Comunisti Italiani)
| PdCI
| 2,661 || 2.12% || 0
|-
| style="background-color:"  |
| style="text-align:left;" | Italy of Values (Italia dei Valori)
| IdV
| 2,544 || 2.03% || 0
|-
| style="background-color:purple"  |
| style="text-align:left;" | Italian Democratic Socialists (Socialisti Democratici Italiani)
| SDI
| 1,630 || 1.30% || 0
|-
| style="background-color:" |
| style="text-align:left;" | Others 
| 
| 4,463 || 3.56% || 1
|- style="background-color:#FA6E79"
| colspan="4" style="text-align:left;" | Casson coalition (Left-wing)
| 51,220 || 40.84% || 10
|-
| style="background-color:lightblue" rowspan="2" |
| style="background-color:" |
| style="text-align:left;" | Forza Italia 
| FI
| 25,726 || 20.51% || 5
|-
| style="background-color:" |
| style="text-align:left;" | Union of the Centre (Unione di Centro)
| UdC
| 3,966 || 3.16% || 0
|-
|- style="background-color:lightblue"
| style="text-align:left;" colspan="4" | Campa coalition (Centre-right)
| 29,692 || 23.67% || 5
|-
| style="background-color:pink" rowspan="2" |
| style="background-color:pink" |
| style="text-align:left;" | The Daisy (La Margherita)
| DL
| 16,855 || 13.44% || 26
|-
| style="background-color:orange" |
| style="text-align:left;" | Union of Democrats for Europe (Unione Democratica per l'Europa)
| UDEUR
| 1,784 || 1.42% || 2
|- style="background-color:pink"
| colspan="4" style="text-align:left;" | Cacciari coalition (Centre-left)
| 18,639 || 14.86% ||28
|-
| style="background-color:" |
| style="text-align:left;" colspan="2" | National Alliance (Alleanza Nazionale)
| AN
| 8,490 || 6.77% || 1
|-
| style="background-color:orange" |
| style="text-align:left;" colspan="2"| Salvadori List–North-East Project (Progetto NordEst)
| PNE
| 5,141 || 4.10% || 1
|-
| style="background-color:#008000" |
| style="text-align:left;" colspan="2"| Lega Nord 
| LN
| 4,955 || 3.95% || 1
|-
| style="background-color:" |
| style="text-align:left;"  colspan="2" | Others 
| 
| 7,280 || 5.80% || 0
|-
| colspan="7" style="background-color:#E9E9E9" | 
|- style="font-weight:bold;"
| style="text-align:left;" colspan="4" | Total
| 125,417 || 100% || 46
|-
| colspan="7" style="background-color:#E9E9E9" | 
|-
| style="text-align:left;" colspan="4" | Votes cast / turnout 
| 168,087 || 72.04% || style="background-color:#E9E9E9;" |
|-
| style="text-align:left;" colspan="4" | Registered voters
| 233,316 ||  || style="background-color:#E9E9E9;" |
|-
| colspan="7" style="background-color:#E9E9E9" | 
|-
| style="text-align:left;" colspan="7" | Source: Ministry of the Interior
|}
Notes

Mayoral and City Council election, 2010
The election took place on 28–29 March 2010.

|- style="background-color:#E9E9E9;text-align:center;"
|- 
| colspan="7"| 
|-
! colspan="4" rowspan="1" style="text-align:left;" | Parties and coalitions
! colspan="1" | Votes
! colspan="1" | %
! colspan="1" | Seats
|-
| style="background-color:pink" rowspan="6" |
| style="background-color:" |
| style="text-align:left;" | Democratic Party (Partito Democratico)
| PD
| 37,027 || 28.89% || 17
|-
| style="background-color:orange" |
| style="text-align:left;" | Italy of Values (Italia dei Valori)
| IdV
| 8,628 || 6.73% || 4
|-
| style="background-color:"  |
| style="text-align:left;" | Federation of the Greens–Bettin List (Federazione dei Verdi)
| FdV
| 4,816 || 3.76% || 2
|-
| style="background-color:"  |
| style="text-align:left;" | Italian Socialist Party (Partito Socialista Italiano)
| PSI
| 4,800 || 3.75% || 2
|-
| style="background-color:" |
| style="text-align:left;" | Federation of the Left (Federazione della Sinistra)
| FdS
| 4,244 || 3.31% || 1
|-
| style="background-color:" |
| style="text-align:left;" | Others 
| 
| 6,177 || 4.82% || 2
|- style="background-color:pink"
| colspan="4" style="text-align:left;" | Orsoni coalition (Centre-left)
| 65,692 || 51.26% || 28
|-
| style="background-color:lightblue" rowspan="4" |
| style="background-color:" |
| style="text-align:left;" | The People of Freedom (Il Popolo della Libertà)
| PdL
| 29,179 || 22.77% || 10
|-
| style="background-color:" |
| style="text-align:left;" | Lega Nord 
| LN
| 14,297 || 11.16% || 4
|-
| style="background-color:blue" |
| style="text-align:left;" | Brunetta List (Lista Brunetta)
| LB
| 8,499 || 6.63% || 2
|-
| style="background-color:" |
| style="text-align:left;" | Others 
| 
| 2,381 || 1.86% || 0
|- style="background-color:lightblue"
| style="text-align:left;" colspan="4" | Brunetta coalition (Centre-right)
| 54,356 || 42.41% || 17
|-
| style="background-color:" |
| style="text-align:left;" colspan="2" | Five Star Movement (Movimento Cinque Stelle)
| M5S
| 4,189 || 3.27% || 1
|-
| style="background-color:" |
| style="text-align:left;" colspan="2" | Others 
|
| 3,928 || 3.07% || 0
|-
| colspan="7" style="background-color:#E9E9E9" | 
|- style="font-weight:bold;"
| style="text-align:left;" colspan="4" | Total
| 128,165 || 100% || 46
|-
| colspan="7" style="background-color:#E9E9E9" | 
|-
| style="text-align:left;" colspan="4" | Votes cast / turnout 
| 151,554 || 68.64% || style="background-color:#E9E9E9;" |
|-
| style="text-align:left;" colspan="4" | Registered voters
| 220,791 ||  || style="background-color:#E9E9E9;" |
|-
| colspan="7" style="background-color:#E9E9E9" | 
|-
| style="text-align:left;" colspan="7" | Source: Ministry of the Interior
|}

Mayoral and City Council election, 2015
These elections were held on two rounds: the first on 31 May, the second on 14 June 2015.

|- 
| colspan="7"| 
|-
|- style="background-color:#E9E9E9;text-align:center;"
! colspan="4" rowspan="1" style="text-align:left;" | Parties and coalitions
! colspan="1" | Votes
! colspan="1" | %
! colspan="1" | Seats
|-
| style="background-color:pink" rowspan="6" |
| style="background-color:#B40404" |
| style="text-align:left;" | Casson List (Lista Casson)
| LC
| 19,991 || 17.10% || 4
|-
| style="background-color:" |
| style="text-align:left;" | Democratic Party (Partito Democratico)
| PD
| 19,667 || 16.83% || 4
|-
| style="background-color:" |
| style="text-align:left;" | Left Ecology Freedom-Greens (Sinistra Ecologia e Libertà - Verdi)
| SEL-FdV
| 1,845 || 1.58% || 0
|-
| style="background-color:" |
| style="text-align:left;" | Venice Common Good (Venezia Bene Comune)
| VBC
| 1,562 || 1.34% || 0
|-
| style="background-color:"  |
| style="text-align:left;" | Italian Socialist Party (Partito Socialista Italiano)
| PSI
| 618 || 0.53% || 0
|-
| style="background-color:orange"  |
| style="text-align:left;" | Democratic Centre (Centro Democratico)
| CD
| 365 || 0.31% || 0
|- style="background-color:pink"
| colspan="4" style="text-align:left;" | Casson coalition (Centre-left)
| 44,058 || 37.69% || 8
|-
| style="background-color:lightblue" rowspan="4" |
| style="background-color:#E0218A" |
| style="text-align:left;" | Brugnaro List (Lista Brugnaro)
| LB
| 24,352 || 20.83% || 17
|-
| style="background-color:" |
| style="text-align:left;" | Forza Italia 
| FI
| 4,405 || 3.77% || 3
|-
| style="background-color:" |
| style="text-align:left;" | Popular Area (Area Popolare)
| AP
| 1,870 || 1.60% || 1
|-
| style="background-color:" |
| style="text-align:left;" | Others 
| 
| 2,818 || 2.41% || 1
|- style="background-color:lightblue"
| style="text-align:left;" colspan="4" | Brugnaro coalition (Centre-right)
| 33,445 || 28.61% ||22
|-
| style="background-color:yellow" |
| style="text-align:left;" colspan="2"| Five Star Movement (Movimento Cinque Stelle)
| M5S
| 15,009 || 12.84% || 3
|-
| style="background-color:#008000" |
| style="text-align:left;" colspan="2"| Lega Nord 
| LN
| 13,997 || 11.97% || 2
|-
| style="background-color:" |
| style="text-align:left;" colspan="2" | Brothers of Italy (Fratelli d'Italia)
| FdI
| 7,847 || 6.71% || 1
|-
| style="background-color:" |
| style="text-align:left;"  colspan="2" | Others 
| 
| 2,530 || 2.16% || 0
|-
| colspan="7" style="background-color:#E9E9E9" | 
|- style="font-weight:bold;"
| style="text-align:left;" colspan="4" | Total
| 116,886 || 100% || 36
|-
| colspan="7" style="background-color:#E9E9E9" | 
|-
| style="text-align:left;" colspan="4" | Votes cast / turnout 
| 126,631 || 59.81% || style="background-color:#E9E9E9;" |
|-
| style="text-align:left;" colspan="4" | Registered voters
| 211,720 ||  || style="background-color:#E9E9E9;" |
|-
| colspan="7" style="background-color:#E9E9E9" | 
|-
| style="text-align:left;" colspan="7" | Source: Ministry of the Interior
|}
Notes

Mayoral and City Council election, 2020
These elections were scheduled to take place in June 2020 but then were postponed to 20–21 September 2020 due to the coronavirus pandemic.

|- 
| colspan="7"| 
|-
|- style="background-color:#E9E9E9;text-align:center;"
! colspan="4" rowspan="1" style="text-align:left;" | Parties and coalitions
! colspan="1" | Votes
! colspan="1" | %
! colspan="1" | Seats
|-
| style="background-color:lightblue" rowspan="5" |
| style="background-color:#E0218A" |
| style="text-align:left;" | Brugnaro List (Lista Brugnaro)
| LB
| 37,914 || 31.67% || 14
|-
| style="background-color:" |
| style="text-align:left;" | Lega 
| L
| 14,806 || 12.37% || 5
|-
| style="background-color:" |
| style="text-align:left;" | Brothers of Italy (Fratelli d'Italia)
| FdI
| 7,855 || 6.56% || 2
|-
| style="background-color:" |
| style="text-align:left;" | Forza Italia 
| FI
| 3,255 || 2.72% || 1
|-
| style="background-color:" |
| style="text-align:left;" | Others 
| 
| 1,148 || 0.96% || 0
|- style="background-color:lightblue"
| style="text-align:left;" colspan="4" | Brugnaro coalition (Centre-right)
| 64,968 || 54.28% || 22
|-
| style="background-color:pink" rowspan="5" |
| style="background-color:" |
| style="text-align:left;" | Democratic Party (Partito Democratico)
| PD
| 22,962 || 19.18% || 8
|-
| style="background-color:" |
| style="text-align:left;" | Green Progressive Venice (Venezia Verde Progressista)
| VVD
| 5,907 || 4.93% || 1
|-
| style="background-color:"  |
| style="text-align:left;" | Italia Viva
| IV
| 4,308 || 3.60% || 1
|-
| style="background-color:" |
| style="text-align:left;" | Italia in Comune–Volt (Italia in Comune–Volt)
| IC–V
| 952 || 0.80% || 0
|-
| style="background-color:" |
| style="text-align:left;" | Others 
| 
| 789 || 0.66% || 0
|- style="background-color:pink"
| colspan="4" style="text-align:left;" | Baretta coalition (Centre-left)
| 34,918 || 29.17% || 10
|-
| style="background-color:blue" |
| style="text-align:left;" colspan="2"| Land and Water 2020 (Terra e Acqua 2020)
| 
| 4,847 || 4.05% || 1
|-
| style="background-color:yellow" | 
| style="text-align:left;" colspan="2"| Five Star Movement (Movimento Cinque Stelle)
| M5S
| 4,716 || 4.05% || 1
|-
| style="background-color:orange" |
| style="text-align:left;" colspan="2" | Party of Venetians (Partito dei Veneti)
| PdV
| 4,228 || 3.53% || 1
|-
| style="background-color:purple" |
| style="text-align:left;" colspan="2" | All the City Together! (Tutta la Città Insieme!)
| 
| 4,104 || 3.42% || 1
|-
| style="background-color:" |
| style="text-align:left;"  colspan="2" | Others 
| 
| 1,906 || 1.59% || 0
|-
| colspan="7" style="background-color:#E9E9E9" | 
|- style="font-weight:bold;"
| style="text-align:left;" colspan="4" | Total
| 119,687 || 100% || 36
|-
| colspan="7" style="background-color:#E9E9E9" | 
|-
| style="text-align:left;" colspan="4" | Votes cast / turnout 
| 128,025 || 62.23% || style="background-color:#E9E9E9;" |
|-
| style="text-align:left;" colspan="4" | Registered voters
|  205,720 ||  || style="background-color:#E9E9E9;" |
|-
| colspan="7" style="background-color:#E9E9E9" | 
|-
| style="text-align:left;" colspan="7" | Source: Ministry of the Interior
|}

References

External links

 List
Venice
Venice-related lists